Chengicherla Abattoir is a slaughterhouse located in Chengicherla village near Hyderabad, TS, India. It is located 30 kilometers away from Hyderabad. The communities that are involved are Aare Katikas and Qureshis.

History
Chengicherla Abattoir was opened in 2003 after a high court verdict.

Infrastructure

The Abattoir has a capacity to slaughter 5,000 sheep and goat, and 4,000 large animals (beef) in each shift. They are working four shifts in a day.

References

Ranga Reddy district
Abattoirs in India